Juliet-Jane Horne is a Scottish model, born in Aberdeen in June 1984. As Miss Scotland, she was crowned the 2nd runner-up at Miss World 2001 and earned the title 'Europe's Queen of Beauty'. As the highest-ranked British beauty at this event, Juliet was also awarded the title of Miss United Kingdom.

References

1984 births
Living people
Miss United Kingdom winners
Miss World 2001 delegates
Scottish female models
People educated at Cults Academy
Scottish beauty pageant winners
Miss International 2002 delegates